Athamanta turbith is a species of flowering plant in the family Apiaceae. It is endemic to southern Europe and northern Africa.

References
 NCBI taxonomy database
 ZipCodeZoo entry

Apioideae